The Otto-Eldred School District is a diminutive, rural, public school district located in McKean County, Pennsylvania. The school district is named after three of the four municipalities it serves: Eldred, Eldred Township, and Otto Township. A portion of Ceres Township is also within the district's taxation and attendance boundaries. According to 2000 federal census data, it serves a resident population of 4,493, while in 2010 the population had declined to 4,172 people. In 2009, Otto-Eldred School District residents' per capita income was $15,580, while the median family income was $38,393. In a hearing before the Pennsylvania House Appropriations Committee in 2009, then Superintendent Falk, reported that Otto-Eldred School District was the poorest in the Commonwealth.

Otto-Eldred School District operates two schools: Otto-Eldred Elementary School and Otto-Eldred Junior Senior High School.

Extracurriculars
The district offers a variety of clubs, activities and an extensive sports program.

Sports
The district funds:

Boys
Baseball - A
Basketball- A
Cross country - A
Football - A
Golf - AA
Track and field - AA

Girls
Basketball - A
Cross country - A
Golf - AA
Softball - A
Track and field - AA
Volleyball

Junior high school sports

Boys
Baseball
Basketball
Cross country
Football
Track and field

Girls
Basketball
Cross country
Track and field
Volleyball 

According to PIAA directory July 2012

References

School districts in McKean County, Pennsylvania
School districts in Potter County, Pennsylvania